Tiny Glacier is in the Wind River Range, Bridger-Teton National Forest, in the U.S. state of Wyoming. The glacier is situated in a north-facing cirque immediately west of the Continental Divide.

See also
 List of glaciers in the United States

References

Glaciers of Sublette County, Wyoming
Glaciers of Wyoming